Robert Shorrock Duxbury (1 January 1890 – 18 April 1962) was an English professional footballer who played for Huddersfield Town.

Druxbury was born in Darwen on New Year's Day 1890 to Robert Shorrock Duxbury Sr., a mill engine tenter, and Margaret Ann Storer. He died in Darwen in 1962.

References

1890 births
1962 deaths
English footballers
People from Darwen
Association football defenders
English Football League players
Huddersfield Town A.F.C. players